Eboni Usoro-Brown (born 4 February 1988) is an English former netball player who played for England and for Queensland Firebirds in the position of defender as well as the goal keeper. She attended Gordon's School in Surrey from 2001 to 2004. Usoro-Brown graduated from the University of Bristol with an LLB Law degree in 2009, before completing the LLM degree in 2010 at the same Law School. Usoro-Brown went on to complete the Legal Practice Course at the University of the West of England.

Career
Usoro-Brown made her international debut for England in 2008 at the age of twenty against Malawi.

She was part of the English netball team where England went onto host the 2009 World Netball Series and was ultimately her first Championship since her debut. Eboni has also served as a key member of the national team at the 2010 Commonwealth Games where England secured a bronze medal in the team event and also played a key part in clinching a silver medal for England in the 2010 World Netball Series. Eboni also named as one of the members of the English netball team for the 2011 World Netball Championships where England settled for the bronze medal in the team event.

Eboni went onto represent England at the 2014 Commonwealth Games for the second consecutive time at the Commonwealth Games and was part of the netball team which went medalless at the competition finishing fourth. At the 2015 World Netball Championships, she was instrumental in England's third-place finish with a defensive role.

She competed for England at the 2018 Commonwealth Games which is also her third successive CWG Games appearance. At the Gold Coast Commonwealth Games, she was part of the English national netball team which stunned defending Commonwealth Games champion and world champion Australia 52–51 in the team event to secure historic gold medal after a thrilling finish.

Usuro-Brown was selected in England's 12-player squad for the 2019 Netball World Cup.

References

External links
 
  (2010, 2014)
 

1988 births
Living people
English netball players
Team Bath netball players
Commonwealth Games gold medallists for England
Commonwealth Games bronze medallists for England
Commonwealth Games medallists in netball
Netball players at the 2010 Commonwealth Games
Netball players at the 2014 Commonwealth Games
Netball players at the 2018 Commonwealth Games
Sportspeople from Solihull
2019 Netball World Cup players
English expatriate netball people in Australia
West Coast Fever players
Black British sportswomen
English people of Nigerian descent
2011 World Netball Championships players
2015 Netball World Cup players
Netball players at the 2022 Commonwealth Games
Queensland Firebirds players
Suncorp Super Netball players
Medallists at the 2010 Commonwealth Games
Medallists at the 2018 Commonwealth Games